Frank C. Worrell is an American psychologist. He is a distinguished professor of Psychology at University of California, Berkeley. He is the 2022 president of the American Psychological Association.

References 

Year of birth missing (living people)
Living people
Presidents of the American Psychological Association
University of California, Berkeley faculty
University of Western Ontario alumni
American educational psychologists
University of California, Berkeley alumni